M.P. Srinivasan is an Indian professor.

Personal 
M.P. Srinivasan popularly known an ‘Mapesee’  was born in 1943, in a small village called Sendi Udayanathapuram near Sivagangai. After graduation in economics, he did his post graduation in Tamil in Thiyagarajar college, Madurai.

Career and awards 
He retired as a professor of Tamil after 34 years of meritorious service.  He loved and learned Alwars works and scholarly commentaries on them.  Besides obtaining Ph.D in the same domain, he has also written many books covering literary criticism, comparative studies, monograph and Biography.  He compiled and edited a few books, including ‘Nalayira Divya Prabhandam’.

2012
Chekkilar Research Centre Award, Chennai.
|Book: கம்பனும் ஆழ்வார்களும்|

2015
Vallal Sadayappa Award, Madurai Kamban Kalakam, Madurai.
|Book: கம்பனும் ஆழ்வார்களும்|

2011
Dr. Mu. Va. Ilakkiya Memorial Award, Kavithai Uravu Association, Chennai.
|Book: ஆழ்வார்களும் தமிழ் மரபும்|

Books compiled

Books edited

References

நூல்களை தேடுங்கள்

சீனிவாசன், ம.பெ புத்தகங்களுக்குத் தமிழியலில் வெளியான மதிப்புரைகள்]

ஆசிரியர் தமிழ் அறிஞர் ம .பெ .சீனிவாசன் ! நூல் விமர்சனம் கவிஞர் இரா .இரவி

OPAC Online Public Access Catalogue 

Dinamalar

1943 births
Living people
Tamil academics